Corbyn, Stacey & Company was a firm of manufacturing and retail chemists established in London in 1726. It was founded by Thomas Corbyn (1711 – 1791), who had been apprenticed to Joseph Clutton; Clutton, his wife Mary, and son Morris became partners in the business. The firm gained an extensive overseas trade in North America and the Caribbean.

George Stacey became a partner in 1772. In 1850, the company acquired the Winstanley & Company business; it was incorporated in 1898. The company once owned a warehouse, laboratory and a shop, but its building was shuttered in 1896.  The company continued as wholesale suppliers until 1927.

The company's records are held in the Wellcome Collection.

References

1726 establishments in England
British companies established in 1726
Pharmaceutical companies of the United Kingdom
Pharmaceutical companies established in 1726